Shikohabad Junction railway station is on the  Delhi–kanpur section  of Howrah–Delhi main line and Howrah–Gaya–Delhi line.  It is located in Firozabad district in the Indian state of Uttar Pradesh. It serves Shikohabad.

History
Through trains started running on the East Indian Railway Company's Howrah–Delhi line in 1866.

A branch line was opened from Shikohabad to Mainpuri in 1905 and extended to Farrukhabad in 1906.

Electrification
The Panki–Tundla sector was electrified in 1971–72.

See also
Firozabad railway station
Tundla Junction railway station
Mainpuri railway station
Etawah Junction railway station
Udi Mor Junction railway station

References

External links
 Trains at Shikohabad

Railway junction stations in India
Railway stations in Firozabad district
Allahabad railway division
Shikohabad